Pterophorus lampra is a moth of the family Pterophoridae. It is known from the Democratic Republic of Congo, Cameroon, Gabon and Ivory Coast.

The forewings are purely white with some black scales near the base and inner margin of the first lobe.

References

lampra
Insects of Cameroon
Insects of the Democratic Republic of the Congo
Insects of West Africa
Fauna of Gabon
Moths of Africa
Moths described in 1969